Sierra de Salinas is a mountain range in the California Coast Ranges, located in central Monterey County, California. The range is a part of the Salinian Block and lies between the Santa Lucia Range to the west and the Salinas Valley, Salinas River, and Gabilan Range to the east.

References 

California Coast Ranges
Mountain ranges of Monterey County, California
Salinas Valley
Santa Lucia Range
Mountain ranges of Northern California